Leigh Phillips is a composer, orchestrator, and conductor of music for film, media, and theatre. In addition to this, he is responsible for developing unique orchestrations, and arrangements, of film-music for live concert performance and recording.

Career
Previous collaborations have included the, BAFTA Award-winning, composer John Ottman, Grammy Award-winning television composer Joe Harnell,  The Halle Orchestra, The Golden State Pops Orchestra, The London Philharmonic Orchestra, soundtrack producers Silva Screen Records and Tadlow Music; his orchestrations and arrangements featuring in productions by companies such as Decca Records, SKY, IMAX, ITV, Channel 4, Prometheus Records, Classic FM, Orchestra Sinfonica di Milano, Fimucite Film Music Festival, Movie Score Malaga, Film Music Prague Festival, World Soundtrack Awards, the BBC, and Marvel Studios.

Film score reconstructions
One particularly prominent feature of Phillips' career has been his involvement in the reconstruction of classic (and previously unreleased) film scores.  Some notable examples of reconstruction projects (both complete scores and compilation albums) that have utilised his orchestrations, include:

 Séance on a Wet Afternoon (John Barry)
 Goldsmith at the General Electric Theater vol. 1 & 2 (Jerry Goldsmith)
 Damnation Alley - vintage synth programming (Jerry Goldsmith)
 The Curse of Frankenstein (James Bernard)
 Dracula (James Bernard)
 Thriller - vol. 2 (Jerry Goldsmith)
 Ben Hur (Miklos Rozsa)
 Thriller - vol.1 (Jerry Goldsmith)
 The Thief of Bagdad (Miklos Rozsa)
 Lawrence of Arabia (Maurice Jarre)
 Conan the Barbarian (Basil Poledouris)
 Taras Bulba (traditional folk-song arrangements)
 Quo Vadis''' (Miklos Rozsa)
 The Salamander (Jerry Goldsmith)
 Public Access (John Ottman)

Other musical projects
Other orchestration & composition projects have included:
 Moon Knight (Limited TV Series)
 Kira & El Gin (Feature Film)
 The Serengeti Rules (Documentary)
 West End Stars in Concert (Tour)
 The Bachelor King 3D (Film)
 Ice Age Giants (BBC Documentary)
 War Made Easy (Documentary)

Music education
Leigh was educated at the Royal Welsh College of Music and Drama where he gained a BA(Wales) degree specialising in composition.  With a long-standing interest in music-education, he was head of film-music composition at The London College of Music (2014 - 2020), where he was responsible for developing the UK's first, film-music specific, Bachelor of Music Degree.

Other activities
When not orchestrating, or composing, Leigh can usually be found at Smecky Music Studios, fulfilling his other role as a freelance producer for film, TV,  video game, and album recording sessions featuring The City of Prague Philharmonic Orchestra.

Awards
In 2014, Leigh was presented with the IFMCA Special Award for his work on the reconstruction of Jerry Goldsmith's score, 'The Salamander'; previous recipients of this award included Marc Shaiman & Scott Wittman, Haiti - The Symphony of Hope project, and James Horner.
*Denotes 2006 Jerry Goldsmith Award for Best Achievement in Audio Visual Music

References 

Living people
British film score composers
British male film score composers
1973 births
21st-century British composers
21st-century British male musicians
Alumni of the Royal Welsh College of Music & Drama